Janga may refer to:

People
Janga Augustus Kowo (born 1974), Liberian politician
Chendupatla Janga Reddy (born 1935), Indian politician
Rangelo Janga (born 1992), Curaçaoan footballer
Rilove Janga (born 1987), Bonairean footballer

Places
Janga, a district in Paulista, Brazil
Janga (mountain), a summit in the Greater Caucasus Mountain Range
Janga, Kerman, a village in Kerman Province, Iran
Türkmenbaşy şäherçesi, a town in Turkmenistan known as Janga until 1993

See also
Jangam
Jenga